The European Medical Students' Association (EMSA) is a non-governmental and non-profit organisation for medical students; it offers opportunities to their members and provides a voice for medical students across Europe, representing their interests to other European institutions and organizations.
EMSA was founded in Brussels in 1990. It integrates medical students in Europe through activities organized for and by medical students. EMSA's network and platform encourages medical students from various countries in geographical Europe to actively engage in matters related to health care, medical education, medical ethics, medical science, and general societal well-being, by acting as a conduit for increased interaction and sharing of knowledge between European medical students in these respective areas.

History
In 1990, the idea to create a European Medical Students' Association was discussed during a symposium for medical students from all European countries organized by students of the Catholic University of Leuven (KUL), Belgium. A working group was created and in October 1990 the European Medical Students' Association was founded in Brussels. The first and official founding EMSA General Assembly was under the patronage of Baudouin I, the King of Belgium, and was financially supported by the European Community's ERASMUS program. The statutes were officially established and published under Belgian law on 17 January 1991.

About EMSA
EMSA was founded in Brussels on 20.10.1990. It integrates medical students in Europe through activities organized for and by medical students and representing them in Brussels.
In EMSA medical faculties are members, not the individual countries. Since the foundation of EMSA many medical faculties throughout Europe enrolled with EMSA. It currently unites over 90 medical faculties from 27 countries across Europe. EMSA seeks to improve the health and the quality of care of the citizens of
Europe by acting as a conduit for increased interaction and sharing of knowledge between European medical students in the areas of medical education, ethics, science and European integration.

EMSA is an associated organisation of the CPME Standing Committee of European Doctors.

Structure
The structure of EMSA which allows maximum effectiveness and control involves the EMSA European Board (EEB) on the European level, the  National Coordinators (NCs) on the National Level, and the Local Coordinators (LCs) on the Local Level.
In the structure of EMSA, medical faculties are members, not the individual countries; these Medical Faculties are referred to as Faculty Member Organizations (FMOs). Since the foundation of EMSA, many medical faculties throughout Europe have enrolled with EMSA. It currently unites over 100 medical faculties from over 25 countries across Europe.

EMSA Pillars

Medical Education Pillar
A Europe of the highest standards in healthcare education and a continuous integration of medical curricula across the continent and a prosperous exchange of best practices in interprofessional education. Empower medical students to be part of shaping an education, that responds to advances in medicine, new learning technologies and philosophy of education.

Medical Ethics and Human Rights Pillar 
A Europe with a common understanding of human rights, where medicine is practised according to the highest ethical values. Empower medical students to defend and actively promote human rights within society, whilst raising awareness of ethical matters in health.

Public Health Pillar 
A Europe of universal well-being, where all policies and practises promote to health and where all have equal access to a high quality health system. Empower medical students to be key pioneers in the popularisation of healthy lifestyle, preventive medicine and health education.

Medical Science Pillar 
A Europe that prospers in the field of medical science and where students are engaging actively in advancing healthcare through scientific research. Create a student platform which encompasses many key research principles and practical skills that are essential for every future healthcare professional, whilst raising appreciation of medical science.

European Integration and Culture Pillar 
A united Europe, with common values and solidarity, providing equal opportunities for healthcare students and professionals, whilst embracing cultural variety. Empower students to participate in European mobility and exchange programmes and to foster their intercultural understanding and compassion toward disadvantaged groups in society.

Health Policy Pillar 
A Europe in which all policies address public health questions creating a European health-care system that promotes patients’ empowerment and safety, and provides fair working conditions for the health-care workforce. Empower medical students to have an impact on policy making processes of the European Institutions by addressing public and global health issues for a long-term improvement of the European health situation.

Governance
The main Governance of the European Medical Students' Association is the EMSA European Board (EEB). In the fall of each year, the EEB is elected during the Autumn Assembly. 
The EEB is made up of :

The Executive Board (EB):
President, 
Secretary General, 
Vice President of Internal Affairs, 
Vice President of External affairs, 
Vice President of Capacity, 
Treasurer

Directors:
(These directors preside over the six Pillars of EMSA)
Medical Science Director, 
Medical Education Director, 
Ethics and Human Rights Director, 
Public Health Director, 
European Integration and Culture Director, 
European Health Policy Director

Officers:
Trainings and Events Officer,
European Institutions Liaison Officer,
Resource Development Officer,
Public Relations Officer

Appointed Officers: 
Permanent Officer (CPME Intern), 
AMEE Representative, 
EuroMeds Editor-in-chief

Meetings

Each year, EMSA delegates and enthusiasts meet at the:
Spring Assembly and the Autumn Assembly
The Spring Assembly and the Autumn Assembly form the General Assembly. In these two meetings, major decisions concerning the Association are made. Activities held include: Plenary sessions- involves voting and election of the EMSA European Board, discussion and adoption of Policy Papers, other key discussions, and guest speaker presentations; Twinning Project Market- where FMOs (Faculty member Organizations) advertise and present their twinning/exchange projects; Pillar Sessions - hosted in parallel by the five pillar directors and aimed at building on current EMSA projects; Workshops and Trainings- soft-skills trainings on topics such as leadership, team building, fundraising, conflict management and many others.

Training New Trainers” Event
EMSA has also established its own soft skills trainings event - “Training New Trainers”  (EMSA - TNT) - which is held once a year. The EMSA Training New Trainers event is a program that focuses on transferring basic knowledge about training-sessions, and teaching specific soft skills.

EMSA BlueCon
This EMSA event, introduced in 2018, will focus on the work of EMSA Pillars. There will be no plenary sessions or elections during this meeting.

Other events and programs include Summer Schools and conferences organized by EMSA and other EMSA partners and friends.

External links

Medical and health student organizations
Student organizations established in 1991
European medical and health organizations
1991 establishments in Europe
European student organizations